Bryan Erickson may refer to:

 Bryan Erickson (musician), musician behind Velvet Acid Christ
 Bryan Erickson (ice hockey) (born 1960), NHL ice hockey player

See also
Brian Erichsen, Canadian rugby union player